Denis Grgic (born 19 September 1991) is a German former professional footballer who plays as a goalkeeper.

Career 
In February 2018, Grgic signed for Bulgarian First League club Etar Veliko Tarnovo.  He was released at the end of the season.

By January 2022, he was no longer playing professionally.

References

External links 
 

1991 births
Living people
German people of Croatian descent
German footballers
Association football goalkeepers
First Professional Football League (Bulgaria) players
SSV Ulm 1846 players
SSV Reutlingen 05 players
FC RM Hamm Benfica players
SFC Etar Veliko Tarnovo players
SpVgg Bayreuth players
German expatriate footballers
German expatriate sportspeople in Luxembourg
Expatriate footballers in Luxembourg
German expatriate sportspeople in Bulgaria
Expatriate footballers in Bulgaria